Tjuvarnas jul (The Thieves' Christmas) was the 2011 SVT Christmas calendar broadcast 1–24 December by Sveriges Television. The plot focuses on a thief named Kurre and his little daughter Charlie. It has a style reminiscent of Charles Dickens' stories.

Plot 
The series is set in Stockholm during the 19th century. Kurre feeds entirely on stealing. He is involved in a gang of thieves led by the evil old woman Madame Bofvén. He lives alone in a loft, until a little girl named Ing-Britt (later renamed to Charlie by Madame Bofvén) who apparently is his daughter shows up outside his door. During the series they approach each other as father and daughter, while Madame Bofvén planning to rob the big department store and the police seek diligently after the thieves. As if that were not enough the store owner seems to have an illicit secret.

Cast 
Stefan Roos – Narrator
Tea Stjärne – Charlie
Gustaf Hammarsten – Kurre
Elisabet Carlsson – Gerda
Jonas Hellman-Driessen – Lönnroth
Maria Kim – Skuggan
Thomas Hedengran – Jönsson
Göran Forsmark – Jansson
Carl Carlswärd – Trollet
Siw Carlsson – Madame Bofvén
Bert Gradin – Bongo
Anne Kulle – Direktörskan
Emilie Nyman – Agnes
Peter Eriksson – Rupert
Claes Månsson – Föreståndaren
Birgitta Sundberg – Barnavårdstant
Urban Frånberg – Personalchef
Bertil Norström – Polismästaren
Madeleine Silfving – Flickan
Bengt Krantz – Borgmästaren

Sequel
A freestanding feature-length film is in production to premiere in late 2014.

References

External links

Yellow Bird Production - Sequel announced

Sveriges Television's Christmas calendar
2011 Swedish television series debuts
2011 Swedish television series endings
Television shows set in Stockholm
Television series set in the 19th century
Swedish-language television shows